Power Division is a Bangladesh government division under the Ministry of Power, Energy and Mineral Resources responsible for electric power industry of Bangladesh.

History
The power division was created in 1998 by the government of Bangladesh as part of reforms of the Ministry of Power, Energy and Mineral Resources. It created a reform policy for the electric power sector in 2000. Together with the Energy and Mineral Resources Division, it received 5 percent of the national budget in 2018. On 2 June 2019, the Power Division announced plans to cancel a contract to Beximco Group to build a solar power plant.

References

1998 establishments in Bangladesh
Organisations based in Dhaka
Government departments of Bangladesh